The 2014 Salina Bombers season was the team's second season as a professional indoor football franchise and second as a member of the Champions Professional Indoor Football League. One of nine teams in the CPIFL for the league's final season, the Salina Bombers were owned by Chris Vercher. The Bombers played their home games at the Bicentennial Center in Salina, Kansas, under the direction of three head coaches in 2014. Coach Bob Frey began the year before stepping down and was succeeded by Eric Clayton.  Clayton resigned and was replaced by Bob Ray.

Season summary
In 2014, the Bombers finished the regular season with a record of 8-4, good enough for 3rd place in the final CPIFL standings. They were defeated 66-37 by the Sioux City Bandits at the Tyson Events Center in the first round of the post-season. Standout players this season included defensive linebacker Meshak Williams who claimed both Defensive Rookie of the Year and Defensive Player of the Year honors from the CPIFL.

Off-field moves
After the 2014 season ended, the Champions Professional Indoor Football League announced it was merging with teams from other leagues to form a new league, Champions Indoor Football.

Awards and honors
2014 1st Team All CPIFL: Ed Prince OL, Meshak Williams DL, DeWayne Autrey DB
2014 CPIFL Defensive Player of the Year: Meshak Williams DL
2014 CPIFL Defensive Rookie of The Year: Meshak Williams DL
2014 CPIFL Best Media Relations/Social Media

Schedule
Key:

Pre-season

Regular season

Post-season

Roster

References

External links
Salina Bombers official website 
Salina Bombers at Our Sports Central

Salina Bombers seasons
Salina Bombers
Salina Bombers